Jack Wilkinson may refer to:
Jack Wilkinson (footballer, born 1902) (1902–1979), English footballer with Sheffield Wednesday, Newcastle United, Lincoln City and other clubs
Jack Wilkinson (footballer, born 1985), English footballer with Hartlepool United
Jack Wilkinson (footballer, born 1931) (1931–1996), English footballer with Sheffield United, Port Vale and Exeter City
Jack Wilkinson (Australian footballer) (1914–2000), Australian rules footballer
Jack Wilkinson (rugby league) (1930–1992), English rugby league footballer who played in the 1940s, 1950s and 1960s, and coached in the 1960s
Jack Wilkinson (Design Manager, born 1995) Design Manager and Rousseau Liaison at a leading Garage Equipment Company in the UK

See also
John Wilkinson (disambiguation)